In ancient Roman religion, Roma was a female deity who personified the city of Rome and more broadly, the Roman state. She was created and promoted to represent and propagate certain of Rome's ideas about itself, and to justify its rule. She was portrayed on coins, sculptures, architectural designs, and at official games and festivals. Images of Roma had elements in common with other goddesses, such as Rome's Minerva, her Greek equivalent Athena and various manifestations of Greek Tyches, who protected Greek city-states; among these, Roma stands dominant,  over piled weapons that represent her conquests, and promising protection to the obedient. Her "Amazonian" iconography shows her "manly virtue" (virtus) as fierce mother of a warrior race, augmenting rather than replacing local goddesses. On some coinage of the Roman Imperial era, she is shown as a serene advisor, partner and protector of ruling emperors. In Rome, the Emperor Hadrian built and dedicated a gigantic temple to her as Roma Aeterna ("Eternal Rome"), and to Venus Felix, ("Venus the Bringer of Good Fortune"), emphasising the sacred, universal and eternal nature of the empire.

Roma's official cult served to advance the propagandist message of Imperial Rome. In Roman art and coinage, she is usually depicted in military form, with helmet and weapons. In Rome's eastern provinces, she was often shown with mural crown or cornucopia, or both. Her image is rarely found in a commonplace or domestic context. Roma was probably favoured by Rome's high-status Imperial representatives abroad, rather than the Roman populace at large. She was depicted on silver cups, arches, and sculptures, including the base of the column of Antoninus Pius. She survived into the Christian period as a personification of the Roman state. Her depiction seated with a shield and spear later influenced that of Britannia, personification of Britain.

Republican era

Identity and iconography
A helmeted figure on Roman coins of 280–276 and 265–242 BC is sometimes interpreted as Roma but the identification is contestable. During the late Second Punic war and the Pyrrhic war, Rome issued coins with a Phrygian helmeted head; some are stamped . In later coin issues, Roma wears varieties of the Attic helmet, the standard pattern for Roman army officers. In cases where clear coin legends are lacking, identification has been unresolved. Other female members of Romes's official pantheon were also helmeted, including Bellona, and Minerva, the latter being equivalent to Greek Athena, who is believed by some scholars to be Roma's original.

The earliest, more-or-less unequivocal coin identification of Roma is a silver stater of c. 275 BC issued by Rome's ethnically Greek allies at Locri, on the Italian peninsula. It shows an enthroned woman with shield and other war-gear, clearly labelled as Roma. Another woman, labelled as Pistis (Greek equivalent to Roman Fides, or "good faith"), stands before Roma with a crown of leaves raised above her head. A Roman denarius of 114/115 shows Roma with Romulus, Remus and the she-Wolf, the mythological beast who fostered them, and nourished them with her milk; the coin image implies that Roma has protected and nourished Rome since its very foundation. Her "Amazonian" appearance recalls the fierce, barbaric, bare-breasted Amazons who fought in the Trojan war alongside the Trojans, supposed ancestors of the Romans. In the late Republican and early Imperial era, Roman literature presents Roma as one of the Roman people's several "Great Mothers", who included Venus and Cybele. Ennius personified the "Roman fatherland" as Roma: for Cicero, she was the "Roman state", but neither of these are  Roma. Though her Roman ancestry is possible – perhaps merely her name and the ideas it evoked, according to Mellor – she emerges as a Greek deity, whose essential iconography and character were already established in Italy, Magna Graecia and Rome.

Earliest cults
The earliest certain cult to  Roma was established at Smyrna in 195 BC, probably to mark Rome's successful alliance against Antiochus III. Mellor has proposed her cult as a form of religio-political diplomacy which adjusted traditional Graeco-Eastern divine monarchic honours to Republican mores: divine honours to the divine personification of the Roman state acknowledged the authority of its offices, Republic and city, but did not displace local, Greek cult to individual Roman benefactors.

In 189 BC, Delphi and Lycia instituted festivals in her honour. Roma as "divine sponsor" of athletics and pan-Hellenic culture seems to have dovetailed neatly into a well-established and enthusiastic festival circuit, and temples to her were outnumbered by her civic statues and dedications. In 133 BC, Attalus III bequeathed the people and territories of Pergamon to Rome, as to a trusted ally and protector. The Pergamene bequest became the new Roman province of Asia, and Roma's cult spread rapidly within it.

In contrast to her putative "Amazonian" Roman original, Greek coinage reduces the ferocity of her image, and depicts her in the "dignified and rather severe style" of a Greek goddess, often wearing a mural crown, or sometimes a Phrygian helmet. She is occasionally bareheaded. In this and later periods, she was often associated with Zeus (as guardian of oaths) and Fides (the personification of mutual trust). Her Eastern cult appealed for Rome's alliance and protection. A panegyric to her survives, in five Sapphic stanzas attributed to the Greek poet Melinno, celebrating her fierce commitment to her offspring and proteges. At this time, her cult in Republican Rome and its Eastern  was virtually non-existent. In her "Amazonian" type, her usually single bare breast signifies the same boldness and fiercely maternal, nurturing virtues. In Hellenistic religious tradition, gods were served by priests and goddesses by priestesses but Roma's priesthood was male, perhaps in acknowledgment of the virility of Rome's military power.
Priesthood of the Roma cult was competed among the highest ranking local elites.

Imperial era

The assassination of Julius Caesar led to his apotheosis and cult as a State  in Rome and her Eastern colonies. Republican values held monarchy in contempt, and despised Hellenic honours – Caesar had fatally courted both – but an outright refusal might offend loyal provincials and allies. A cautious formula was drawn up: non-Romans could only offer him cult as  jointly with  Roma. Roma had an Imperial role as consort to the emperor and mother of the entire Roman people. In Greek city-states her iconography would have merged with that of the local Tyche; this usually included a mural crown and cornucopia. Roma's seated pose, seen in more than half the known depictions, was also used for Athena, the Hellenic equivalent of Roman Minerva. Like Athena, Roma represents "manly" female virtues, a personification of an empire built on conquest. From here on, Roma increasingly took the attributes of an Imperial or divine consort to the Imperial , but some Greek coin types show her as a seated or enthroned authority, and the Imperial  standing upright as if her supplicant or servant.

In the western part of the Empire, the foundation of the Imperial cult centre at Lugdunum introduced Roman models for provincial and municipal assemblies and government, a Romanised lifestyle, and an opportunity for local elites to enjoy the advantages of Roman citizenship through election to Imperial cult priesthood. Its  (altar) was dedicated to Roma and Augustus. Thereafter, Roma's presence is well attested by inscriptions and coinage throughout the Western provinces. Literary sources have little to say about her, but this may reflect her ubiquity rather than neglect: in the early Augustan era, as in Greece, she may have been honoured above her living Imperial consort.

In provincial Africa, one temple to Roma and Augustus is known at Leptis Magna and another at Mactar. On the Italian peninsula, six have been proven – Latium built two, one of them privately funded. During the reign of Tiberius, Ostia built a grand municipal temple to Roma and Augustus.

In the city of Rome itself, the earliest known state cult to  Roma was combined with cult to Venus at the Hadrianic Temple of Venus and Roma. The temple contained the seated, fully draped, Hellenised and highly influential image of  Roma – the Palladium in her right hand symbolised Rome's eternity. In Rome, this was a novel realisation.

Following the defeat of Clodius Albinus and his allies by Septimius Severus at Lugdunum, Roma was removed from the Lugdunum cult  to the temple, where along with the Augusti she was co-opted into a new formulation of Imperial cult. Fishwick interprets the reformed rites at Lugdunum as those offered any  by his slaves. It is not known how long this phase lasted, but it appears to have been a unique development.
In a later, even more turbulent era, a common coin type of Probus shows him in the radiate solar crown of the Dominate: the reverse offers Rome's Temple of Venus and dea Roma. While Probus' image shows his monarchic Imperium, Roma displays his claims to restoration of Roman tradition and Imperial unity.

In arts, craft and literature

Lucan's poem, Pharsalia, depicts Roma as a strong woman who represents Roman values. The poem follows the civil war between Julius Caesar and the forces of the Roman Senate, led by Pompey the Great. Caesar, having repudiated Roma and her values, ends up with a mistress in Egypt (Cleopatra), having set his own destiny on a path to eventual self-destruction. The poet identifies Roma (the ) with the idealised Roman matrona. A man who rejects either one cannot be truly Roman.

Roma is represented as a major character on the silver Boscoreale cup. She stands helmeted, prepared for war, vigilant but at peace. Her foot rests on a "weapon pile"; trophies of past conflict. She converses with a young, standing male usually identified as the genius of the Roman people, who appears to be waiting to speak with the seated emperor (probably Augustus). In the Gemma Augustea sculpture by Dioscurides, Roma sits beside Augustus in military apparel.

On the Arch of Titus (1st-century CE), the arch of Septimius Severus and the arch of Constantine, Roma accompanies the emperor in his chariot, as his escort.

Figures of Roma are rare in a domestic context, throughout the Empire, and in the provinces they may have been associated with Roman residents. In Corinth, a statuette of Roma was found, along with those of other deities, in a domestic shrine in the Panayia Domus, tentatively dated to the 2nd or 3rd century AD. The deities were smaller than life but all were well-crafted and most had traces of gilding: the Roma figure sits on a backless chair, and wears a triple-crested war-helmet and a peplum. She has one breast exposed and wears shin-high openwork boots, based on a "draped Amazon", warlike type. Sterling speculates an official connection between the owners of this Roma figure and the nearby Corinthian Temple 1.

In the New Testament
In the Book of Revelation, the letter to the church in Pergamum (2:12–17) warns against any Christian involvement in the Pergamene cult to the deified Augustus and the goddess Roma. In this particular strand of Christian scholarship, contemporary Rome is a "satanic power"; the image of Dea Roma on a sestertius of Vespasian, reclining on her seven hills with various accoutrements, is taken by some as evidence that Dea Roma, or else Rome itself, was the Great Whore of Babylon. In Revelation 17:9 it is said that she sits on "seven mountains" (King James Version; the New International Version uses the words "seven hills") typically understood as the seven hills of Rome. Although some scholars recognize that Babylon is a cipher for Rome, they also claim that Babylon represents more than the Roman city of the first century. Craig Koester says outright that "the whore is Rome, yet more than Rome". It "is the Roman imperial world, which in turn represents the world alienated from God".

Legacy
"As personification, as goddess or as symbol, the name Roma stretches from classical Greece to Mussolini's Fascist propaganda ... Roma has been seen as a goddess, a whore, a near-saint, and as the symbol of civilization itself. She remains the oldest continuous political-religious symbol in Western civilization." Ronald Mellor, Introduction, The goddess Roma.

Notes

References
Ando, Clifford, Imperial ideology and provincial loyalty in the Roman Empire, illustrated, University of California Press, 2000. 
Beard, M.,  Price, S.,  North, J.,  Religions of Rome: Volume 1, a History, illustrated, Cambridge University Press, 1998. 
Fishwick, Duncan. The imperial cult in the Latin West: studies in the ruler cult of the western provinces of the Roman Empire. Brill, 1987–2005.
Galinsky, Karl.  Augustan Culture: An Interpretive Introduction, Princeton University Press, Princeton, New Jersey, 1996.  
Mellor, R., "The Goddess Roma" in Haase, W., Temporini, H., (eds), Aufstieg und Niedergang der romischen Welt, de Gruyter, 1991. pp 950–1030.

External links

Roman goddesses
National personifications
Personifications in Roman mythology
Tutelary deities
Hellenistic deities
Whore of Babylon
Civic personifications